Conspiracy theories alleging Ukrainian interference in US politics include:

Conspiracy theories related to the Trump–Ukraine scandal
Biden–Ukraine conspiracy theory
Russia investigation origins counter-narrative

Ukraine–United States relations